This article is the Electoral history of Paul Martin, the twenty-first Prime Minister of Canada.

A liberal, Martin served one term as Prime Minister (2003 to 2006), succeeding Jean Chrétien.

Martin led the Liberal Party of Canada in two general elections (2004 and 2006). Following his defeat in the 2006 election, he resigned as prime minister and party leader.  He was succeeded as prime minister by Stephen Harper, leader of the Conservative Party of Canada.  Stéphane Dion succeeded him as leader of the Liberal Party.

Martin stood for election to the House of Commons of Canada six times and was elected each time.  He served continuously in the House from 1988 to 2008.

Martin stood for election as leader of the Liberal Party twice.  He lost in 1990 to Chrétien, but he won in 2003, succeeding Chrétien as Liberal leader and prime minister.

Summary 

Martin ranks fifteenth out of twenty-three prime ministers for time in office, serving one term of two years and fifty-six days.

Martin was the seventh of eight prime ministers from Quebec, the others being Sir John Abbott, Sir Wilfrid Laurier, Louis St. Laurent, Pierre Trudeau, Brian Mulroney, Jean Chrétien, and Justin Trudeau.

Martin was first elected to the House of Commons at age 50, in the federal election of 1988.  Following the Liberal victory in the 1993 general election, Martin was appointed to Cabinet as Minister of Finance by Prime Minister Jean Chrétien.  He remained in Cabinet until 2002, when he resigned to begin a challenge to Chrétien's leadership of the Liberal Party.

Martin sought the leadership of the Liberal Party twice, in 1990 and 2003.  He lost the 1990 challenge to Chrétien, but following Chrétien's announcement of his retirement in 2002, Martin won the 2003 leadership convention and succeeded Chrétien as Liberal leader and prime minister.

Martin led the Liberals in the general elections of 2004 and 2006.  In the 2004 election, he won a minority government against Stephen Harper, but his government was defeated in the House of Commons on a motion of no confidence in November 2005.  In the subsequent election in January 2006, he was defeated by Harper and the Conservatives, who formed a minority government.

Stéphane Dion succeeded him as leader of the Liberal Party.

Martin stood for election to the House of Commons six times, and was elected each time, for the riding of LaSalle—Émard.  His total service in the House of Commons was nineteen years, ten months, and twenty-three days.

Following his defeat in the 2006 election, he resigned as Liberal leader, but remained in the House of Commons until the 2008 general election.  He then retired from politics.

Federal general elections: 2004 and 2006 

Martin led the Liberal Party in two general elections: 2004 and 2006.  He was reduced to a minority government in the 2004 election, but lost to Harper and the Conservative Party of Canada in the 2006 election.

Federal election, 2004 

In his first general election, Martin won a minority government, defeating the new Conservative leader, Stephen Harper. However, he lost the majority the Liberals went into the election with.

1 Prime Minister when election was called;  Prime Minister after election.
2 Leader of the Opposition when election was called;  Leader of the Opposition after the election.
3 Table does not include parties which received votes but did not elect any members.

Federal election, 2006 

In his second general election, Martin was defeated by Harper, who formed a minority government.

1 Leader of the Opposition when election was called;  Prime Minister after election.
2 Prime Minister when election was called;  Member of Parliament after the election.
3 Table does not include parties which received votes but did not elect any members.

Federal constituency elections: 1988 to 2006 

Martin  stood for election to the House of Commons eight times. He was elected each time, often with substantial majorities.

1988 Federal Election:  LaSalle—Émard 

 Elected. 
X Incumbent.

1993 Federal Election:  LaSalle—Émard 

 Elected. 
X Incumbent.

1997 Federal Election:  LaSalle—Émard 

 Elected. 
X Incumbent.

2000 Federal Election:  LaSalle—Émard 

 Elected. 
X Incumbent. 
1 Rounding error.

2004 Federal Election:  LaSalle—Émard 

 Elected. 
X Incumbent. 
1 Rounding error.

2006 Federal Election:  LaSalle—Émard 

 Elected. 
X Incumbent.

Liberal Party Leadership Conventions:  1990, 2003 

Martin contested the Liberal leadership twice.  He lost in 1990 to Chrétien, who then led the Liberal party in the next three general elections.  Turner retired in 2003 and Martin won the subsequent leadership convention.

1990 Leadership Convention 

Following the Liberal defeat in the 1988 general election, Turner announced his retirement.  At the leadership convention held in 1990,  Martin lost to Chrétien, who became the Liberal leader.

1 Rounding error.

2003 Leadership Convention 

In 2002, Chrétien announced that he would retire in 2003.  At the 2003 leadership convention,  Martin overwhelmingly won the Liberal leadership on the first ballot.

See also 

 Electoral history of Jean Chrétien - Martin's predecessor as leader of the Liberal Party and as Prime Minister.
 Electoral history of Stephen Harper - Martin's successor as Prime Minister.

References

External links 

 Library of Parliament:  History of Federal Ridings since 1867
 CPAC – 1990 Liberal Leadership Convention
 CPAC – 2003 Liberal Leadership Convention

Martin, Paul